The beer riots in Bavaria happened between 1 May and 5 May 1844, beginning after King Ludwig I of Bavaria decreed a tax on beer. Crowds of urban workers beat up police while the Bavarian army showed reluctance to get involved. Civil order was restored only after the King decreed a ten percent reduction in the price of beer.  Following the Revolutions of 1848, Ludwig I abdicated in favour of his son, Maximilian II.

See also
Beer riots in Chicago: the Lager Beer Riot

References

Protests in Germany
German beer culture
Riots and civil disorder in Germany
1844 riots
1844 in Bavaria
Rebellions in Germany
May 1844 events